Kim Soon-Hee (김순희 , born  in Hanam), also spelled Kim Sun-hui, is a South Korean weightlifter, competing in the 75 kg category and representing South Korea at international competitions.

She participated at the 2000 Summer Olympics in the 75 kg event finishing fourth and at the 2004 Summer Olympics in the 75 kg event finishing seventh. She competed at world championships, most recently at the 2006 World Weightlifting Championships.

Major results

References

External links
 

1977 births
Living people
South Korean female weightlifters
Weightlifters at the 2004 Summer Olympics
Olympic weightlifters of South Korea
Weightlifters at the 2000 Summer Olympics
World Weightlifting Championships medalists
Weightlifters at the 1998 Asian Games
Weightlifters at the 2002 Asian Games
Weightlifters at the 2006 Asian Games
Asian Games medalists in weightlifting
Asian Games silver medalists for South Korea
Asian Games bronze medalists for South Korea
Medalists at the 1998 Asian Games
Medalists at the 2002 Asian Games
Medalists at the 2006 Asian Games
Sportspeople from Gyeonggi Province
20th-century South Korean women
21st-century South Korean women